The Pius XII Museum (in Portuguese: Museu Pio XII) is located in Braga, Portugal, in the same building of the Museum Medina, as the name from the Pope Pius XII.

The collection of the museum comprise Palaeolithic, Neolithic and Bronze Age implements, Pre-historic and Luso-Roman pottery.

In the museum is a Peristyle part of a Roman Villa in the original location.

See also
 List of Jesuit sites

 

M
Biographical museums in Portugal
Museums in Braga
Museums established in 1957
Archaeological museums in Portugal